Gabriel St. Laurent (4 August 1888 – 17 December 1968) was a French rower. He competed in the men's eight event at the 1912 Summer Olympics.

References

1888 births
1968 deaths
French male rowers
Olympic rowers of France
Rowers at the 1912 Summer Olympics
Sportspeople from Bayonne